Arvo Kruusement (born 20 April 1928) is an Estonian actor, theatre and film director who has made some of Estonia's classic novels into films; Spring (1969), Summer (1976), and Fall (1990) The movie Spring has been noted as the best Estonian feature film in the Top Ten Poll held by Estonian film critics and journalists in 2002. In 1970 the movie sold 558,000 tickets in Estonia (Total population 1.34 million) and in 1971 8,100,000 tickets in Soviet Union.

Arvo Kruusement attended GITIS in Moscow, Russia from where he graduated in 1953. in 1953-1961 he worked as an actor at the Estonian Drama Theatre in Tallinn. In 1962-1964 Arvo Kruusement was the director of the Endla Theatre in Pärnu, Estonia, and film director for Tallinnfilm in 1965–1991.

References

External links

1928 births
Living people
People from Kadrina Parish
Estonian film directors
Estonian male film actors
Recipients of the Order of the White Star, 3rd Class